Gabrielona roni is a species of small sea snail with calcareous opercula, a marine gastropod mollusk in the family Phasianellidae, the pheasant snails.

Distribution
This marine species occurs off Oman.

References

External links
 To World Register of Marine Species

Phasianellidae
Gastropods described in 1993